The Defence Intelligence Agency (DIA) is an intelligence agency responsible for providing and coordinating defence and military intelligence to the Indian Armed Forces.

It was created in March 2002 and is administered within the Ministry of Defence.

History
The creation of an intelligence agency coordinating the intelligence arms of the three military services had long been called for by senior Indian military officers. It was formally recommended by the Cabinet Group of Ministers, headed by the then Deputy Prime Minister of India Lal Krishna Advani. The Group of Ministers investigated intelligence lapses that occurred during the Kargil War and recommended a comprehensive reform of Indian intelligence agencies. The Defence Intelligence Agency was created and became operational in March, 2002. As part of expanding bilateral cooperation on gathering intelligence and fighting terrorism, the United States military also provided advice to Indian military officers on the creation of the DIA.

Organisation

Director General
The Director General of the Defence Intelligence Agency is the head of the entire organisation. The director general is the principal advisor on intelligence to the Minister of Defence and the Chief of Defence Staff. The post of the director general will be held in rotation between the three armed services. The first Director General of the DIA was Lt. Gen. Kamal Davar, former director of the mechanised forces of the Indian Army. The Director General of the Agency is assisted by the Deputy Director General, held first by Air Marshal S. C. Malhan.

Nodal agency
DIA is the nodal agency for all defence related intelligence, thus distinguishing it from the other Indian intelligence internal and external agencies. DIA controls the Indian Armed Forces' technical intelligence assets – the Directorate of Signals Intelligence, a tri-service agency, and the Defence Image Processing and Analysis Centre (DIPAC). While the Signals Directorate is responsible for acquiring and decrypting enemy communications, the DIPAC controls India's satellite-based image acquisition capabilities.

The DIA also coordinates the Defence Information Warfare Agency (DIWA) which handles all elements of the information warfare repertoire, including psychological operations, cyber-war, electronic intercepts and the monitoring of sound waves. Its operations are highly classified and has several successes to its credit which will remain a secret.

Functions
Before the creation of the Defence Intelligence Agency, the military intelligence capability of India's armed forces was limited to Field Intelligence Units (FIU) and separate intelligence arms of the services. These distinct services were not able to effectively coordinate intelligence operations and sharing of information. The armed forces also heavily relied on civilian intelligence agencies such as the Research and Analysis Wing and the Intelligence Bureau. With wide-ranging resources and functions, the DIA will be superior to and coordinate the Directorate of Military Intelligence, Directorate of Air Intelligence and the Directorate of Naval Intelligence.

See also
 List of Indian intelligence agencies

References

2002 establishments in Delhi
Government agencies established in 2002
Defence agencies of India
Indian intelligence agencies
Military of India
Military intelligence agencies
Joint military units and formations of India